Brookwood North Historic District in Valdosta, Georgia is a historic district which was listed on the National Register of Historic Places in 1995.  The listing included 218 contributing buildings and a contributing site, as well as 88 non-contributing buildings.  Its  area is roughly bounded by Patterson St., Georgia Ave., Oak St., Park Ave., Williams St. and Brookwood Dr.

The district includes architectural work by Lloyd B. Greer, Felton Davis, and others.
It includes 48 homes designed by Greer, a local Valdosta architect, including his own home at 114 Alden Street.  Three English Vernacular Revival-style houses by him, named "Faith", "Hope", and "Charity" are along East Alden and have large front-gabled facades and steeply-pitched roofs.  Another of Greer's works is the International-style house at 1407 Williams Street.

It includes the entirety of three areas developed as subdivisions:
Pine Park/Victory Subdivision, developed in 1921, a four-block area north of East Alden
Moore-West Land Company, developed in 1923, area of Patterson St., Georgia Ave., and Park Ave.
Dasher-West Subdivision, developed in 1927.

References

External links

Historic districts on the National Register of Historic Places in Georgia (U.S. state)
Late 19th and Early 20th Century American Movements architecture
Buildings and structures completed in 1898
National Register of Historic Places in Lowndes County, Georgia